Montgomery High School (MOH) is a four-year (grade levels 9–12) public high school located in the city of San Diego, California. It opened in 1970 and is situated today on its original campus in Otay Mesa. Montgomery High School serves more than 2,500 students and is named after pioneer aviator John J. Montgomery, who made the first manned glider flight in U.S. history from a hill in the area where the school is located.

In 1975, Tagalog class was first offered as a foreign language in California at Montgomery. A new library, named for founding principal Joseph C Torres, was opened in February 2012, and other buildings were added for the adult school on the same campus grounds.

Notable alumni 
Wuv Bernardo, 1991 - Drummer for P.O.D
Alfredo Gutiérrez, 2015 - Professional football player
Óscar Gutiérrez, 1993 - Professional wrestler
William McLeroy, 1978 - Firefighter
Sergio Mitre, 1999 - Professional baseball player
Óscar Robles, 1994 - Professional baseball player
Thunder Rosa, 2006 - Professional wrestler
Sonny Sandoval, 1991 - singer for P.O.D
Tony Walker, 1977 - Professional baseball player

See also
 Sweetwater Union High School District

References

External links
 Official website

Educational institutions established in 1970
High schools in San Diego
Public high schools in California
1970 establishments in California